Lesedi Cultural Village is a tourist village which celebrates the cultural traditions of several different peoples of Southern Africa. It reproduces traditional dwellings and offers demonstrations of dances and other cultural activities. It is situated near Johannesburg, within the Cradle of Humankind, in Gauteng, South Africa.

References
The New York Times.  Lesedi Cultural Village Journal;My Hut Is Your Hut: South Africa's New Tourism. By DONALD G. MCNEIL JR. Published: May 17, 1996

SouthAfrica.info – Cultural Experiences – Lesedi Cultural Village – 7 February 2006
Repackaging the Past for South African Tourism. Daedalus 01-JAN-2001

External links
Lesedi Cultural Village Official site.

Tourist attractions in Gauteng